The defending champions were Lee Hsin-han and Peng Hsien-yin, but they chose not to compete.
Chen Ti and Guillermo Olaso defeated Jordan Kerr and Konstantin Kravchuk 7–6(7–5), 7–5 in the final to win the title.

Seeds

Draw

Draw

References
 Main Draw

Karshi Challengerandnbsp;- Doubles
2013 Doubles